The Assyrian conquest of Aram (c. 856-732 BCE) concerns the series of conquests of largely Aramean, Phoenician, Sutean and Neo-Hittite states in the Levant (modern Syria, Lebanon and northern Jordan) by the Neo-Assyrian Empire (911-605 BCE). This region was known as Eber-Nari and Aramea during the Middle Assyrian Empire (1365-1020 BCE) and the Neo-Assyrian Empire.

Background
Parts of the eastern Levant had been under the dominion of the Old Assyrian Empire (c.2025-1750 BCE) at a time when the Levant was largely occupied by Amorite and Canaanite tribes. During the Middle Assyrian Empire (1365-1020 BCE) Assyria rose to be possibly the most powerful nation in the world, and conquered much of the Near East and Asia Minor, as well as extending into the Caucasus, the Arabian peninsula and Ancient Iran.

It was during the latter part of this period that the West Semitic Arameans first appear in the region. They, alongside a host of other peoples, were subjugated by powerful Assyrian kings during the Middle Assyrian Empire. However, a civil war during the reign of Ashur-bel-kala (1074-1056 BCE) greatly weakened the Middle Assyrian Empire, and after his death Arameans, Phoenicians, Neo-Hittites and other peoples in the Levant gradually began to assert their independence and form their own patchwork of states.

In modern terms the interior of modern Syria (the Assyrian north-east excluded), the region had since at least the 24th century BCE been inhabited by the Canaanite speaking Amorites and for a time the East Semitic speaking Eblaites also, thus much of this region had been known as the 'Land of the Amurru'. However from the 12th century BCE a new Semitic group appeared, in the form of the Arameans, and by the late 11th century BCE this region was known as Aramea/Aram and Eber-Nari ("Across the River", that is, west of the Euphrates), and remained named as such during the latter part of the Middle Assyrian Empire, Neo-Assyrian Empire, Neo-Babylonian Empire, Median Empire and Achaemenid Empire. The term Syria which today applies to the region is in actuality originally a 10th-century BCE Indo-Anatolian name for Assyria, many centuries later applied by the Greeks during the Seleucid Empire (311-150 BCE) not only to Assyria itself but much of the Levant (see Etymology of Syria).

Some of the major Aramean speaking kingdoms included; Aram-Damascus, Hamath, Bit Adini, Bit Bahiani, Bit Hadipe, Aram-Bet Rehob, Aram-Zobah, Bit-Zamani, Bit-Halupe and Aram-Ma'akah, as well as the Aramean tribal polities of the Gambulu, Litau and Puqudu. In the northern Levant, the remnants of the Hittites endured in the form of small Neo-Hittite states, and along the Mediterranean coast, Phoenician city states such as Tyre, Sidon, Arvad and Berytus were extant, while Sutean and Aramean tribes dwelt in the southern deserts.

Northern Canaan (in modern terms Lebanon, the Mediterranean coast of Syria, and far south-west coast of Turkey) remained inhabited by Canaanite-speaking peoples and was not a part of Aramea. These Canaanites coalesced into city states such as Tyre, Sidon, Berytus, Arvad, Simyra, Onoba and Tarshish. The term Phoenicia was applied to this region, but it is a later Greek application which was not used during the Assyrian period.

To the south of Aram in southern Canaan (in modern terms Israel, the Palestinian Territories, Sinai and Jordan) was also not part of Aram, and was inhabited by a number of Semitic states speaking Canaanite languages, these being Israel, Judah, Samarra, Ammon, Edom, Moab, the Suteans and Amalekites. In addition, the non-indigenous Philistines migrated into this region from the Aegean, a non-Semitic Indo-European speaking people.

The land of Assyria itself encompassed what is today the northern half of modern Iraq, north-east Syria, south-east Turkey and the north-western fringe of Iran. During the mid 11th to late 10th century BCE Assyria was pressed on all sides by tribal and mountain peoples, including Aramean tribes at times occupying Tur Abdin, Nisibin and the Khabur Delta in the north-eastern Levant, areas long considered to be integral parts of Assyria itself. Thus Assyria had difficulty keeping its trade routes open, and its borders were constantly threatened by tribal peoples.

Assyrian conquest
The Neo-Assyrian Empire begins with the accession of Adad-nirari II in 911 BCE. He drove Arameans from Assyrian territory in Tur-Abdin, the Khabur Delta, Jazirah, the Kashiari mountains, Amid (modern Diyarbakir) and Mérida (modern Mardin) thus securing the borders of Assyria proper.

Large scale invasion began with the conquests of Ashurnasirpal II (883-859 BCE) who secured large swathes of eastern and northern Aram for Assyria, then advanced to the Mediterranean, forcing tribute upon the Phoenician city states of the coast.

Shalmaneser III (859-824 BCE) continued the trend, conquering Bit Adini in 856 BCE and driving the Neo-Hittites from Carchemish. In attempt to halt Assyrian expansion, a huge coalition of nations united to oppose the Assyrian king, this alliance included not just the Aramean, Phoenician, Neo-Hittite and Sutean kingdoms and tribes of the region, but also the Babylonians, Egyptians, Elamites, Israelites and Arabs (the first mention of Arabs in historical record). This array of nations confronted the Assyrian army the Battle of Qarqar in 853 BCE, however they failed to defeat Shalmaneser III and the Assyrian king was then able to pick off his enemies individually over the next few years, and by the end of his reign most of the Levant was either under direct Assyrian rule or paying tribute.

However, during the reign of Shamshi-Adad V (823-811 BCE) and queen Semiramis (811-806 BCE) further expansion in Aramea was largely suspended due to instability in Assyria itself.

When Adad-nirari III (811-783 BCE) ascended the throne, he resumed vigorous Assyrian expansion in all directions. In 796 BCE he conquered Aram-Damascus, an event which it never truly recovered from.

Shalmaneser IV(783–773 BCE), Ashur-dan III (772-755 BCE) and Ashur-nirari V (754-745 BCE) maintained Assyrian possessions, but were unable to expand much further due to power struggles with their own nobles and generals.

However, in 744 BCE Tiglath-Pileser III (744-727 BCE) ascended the throne and conquered the entirety of the Levant, and in 732 BCE, he destroyed the kingdom of Aram-Damascus for ever in the process.

This region, known as Aram and Eber-Nari, remained an integral part of the Neo-Assyrian Empire until its collapse in 612 BCE, although some northern parts of the region remained under the control of the remnants of the Assyrian army and administration until 599 BCE.

Subsequent to this much of the region fell to the short-lived Neo-Babylonian Empire (612-539 BCE), and the whole region of modern Syria, Lebanon, the south central Turkish borders and northern Jordan eventually became a satrapy of the Achaemenid Empire (539-332 BCE), and was still known as Aramea and Eber-Nari throughout this period with the exception of the Assyrian-inhabited north-east of today's modern Syria and south-east of modern Turkey, which was a part of the satrapy of Athura (Achaemenid Assyria).

The Seleucid Empire (312-150 BCE) succeeded the Achaemenid Persians. The fact that it had long been ruled by Assyria lead the Greeks to label the land Syria, which was in fact originally a 9th-century BCE Indo-European derivative of Assyria and had not previously referred to Aram, the Levant or its peoples (see Etymology of Syria). Eventually this led to the generic use of the terms Syrian and Syriac to describe both the actual Assyrians of northern Mesopotamia themselves, and the largely Aramean and Phoenician peoples of the Levant.

References

9th century BC
9th-century BC conflicts
Military history of the Assyrian Empire
9th-century BC in Assyria
8th-century BC in Assyria
Aramea